Hanging by a Thread is a 1979 television disaster movie starring Sam Groom about friends stranded in a disabled cable-car above a ravine. The occupants of the cable car reflect on the past as the film flashes back and forth to show each of the character's lives. It was written by Adrian Spies, directed by Georg Fenady and produced by Irwin Allen. The film co-starred Patty Duke, Donna Mills, Oliver Clark and Cameron Mitchell.

Cast
 Sam Groom as Paul Craig
 Patty Duke as Sue Grainger
 Joyce Bulifant as Anita Minton
 Oliver Clark as Eddie Minton
 Bert Convy as Alan Durant
 Burr DeBenning as Jim Grainger
 Peter Donat as Mr. Durant
 Donna Mills as Ellen Craig
 Cameron Mitchell as Lawton
 Roger Perry as Mitchell
 Lonny Chapman as Charles Minton

Reception
The New York Times called it "modest, predictable and not very thrilling."

It was repeated in 1981.

References

External links

1979 films
1979 drama films
1979 television films
1970s adventure drama films
1970s disaster films
1970s English-language films
American adventure drama films
American disaster films
Disaster television films
Films directed by Georg Fenady
Films produced by Irwin Allen
Films scored by Richard LaSalle
Films shot in California
NBC network original films
1970s American films